Vladimir Oblast is a federal subject of Russia (an oblast). As of the 2010 Census, the oblast's population was 1,443,693.

The UNESCO World Heritage List includes the 12th-century cathedrals of Vladimir, Suzdal, Bogolyubovo, and Kideksha.

Geography
Vladimir Oblast borders Moscow, Yaroslavl, Ivanovo, Ryazan, and Nizhny Novgorod Oblasts. The oblast is situated in the center of the East European Plain. The Klyazma and the Oka are the most important rivers. There are approximately three hundred lakes. The oblast is situated in a zone of mixed forests.

Fauna
The oblast's fauna currently includes more than fifty species of mammals (some examples including elk, wild boar, roe deer, red and sika deer, lynx, wolf, squirrel, rabbit, marten, fox, weasel, badger and other fur-bearing animals), five species of reptiles, and ten species of amphibians. The semiaquatic Russian desman is listed in the Russian Red Book of endangered species. The region is inhabited by 216 species of birds, among which are the capercaillie, black grouse, grouse, partridge, woodcock, goose, duck, etc. The lesser white-fronted goose is listed in the Red Book.

Hunting season runs from October to February with the following license and permit restrictions:
Elk, wild boar, red deer, and sika deer from mid-November through mid-January
Hare from October through January
Grouse, black grouse, woodcock, duck and goose for 10 days in April.

Bodies of water in the region are rich in numerous species (about 40) of fresh-water fish (e.g. eel, roach, pike, perch, bream, rudd, and sturgeon in the Klyazma River), which support ice fishing in winter. Additionally, the oblast has several hunting farms.

Hydrography
The total expanse of the oblast's surface waters is 32.9 hectares.

The region has hundreds of rivers with a total length of more than 8.6 million kilometers—there are 560 rivers and streams throughout the oblast. The Klyazma River flows into the Oka River on the south-eastern edge of the oblast's border with the Nizhny Novgorod Region. The Klyazma River's major tributaries in the Vladimir Region are the Sherna (with the Molokcha flowing into it), the Kirzhach (with its own tributaries being the Big and Small Kirzhach), the Peksha, the Koloksha, the Nerl, the Sudogda, the Uvod, the Lukh and the Suvorosch. Tributaries of the Oka within Vladimir oblast are the Gus, Unzha, and Ushna rivers. The Dubna River, a tributary of the Volga River, originates near the town of Alexandrov. The Oka River is navigable throughout the region (157 km). The rivers in the region are characterized by their flat currents, broad valleys and meandering channels. Water levels are characterized by their high spring tides, low water periods over summer-autumn with occasional flooding during heavy rains, and stable/low levels throughout the winter.

There are about three hundred lakes covering an area of five thousand hectares. Most of them are small and undrained and many are overgrown with a peat layer. The origin of the lakes varies. Numerous oxbow lakes are scattered along the river valleys. The largest of them are Lake Urvanovskoe (12 km long) and Lake Visha (length about 10 km). In the Meshchera Lowlands and in the northwest of the oblast are lakes of ancient alluvial valleys: Isikhry, Svyatoe and others. Lakes of karst origin, located in the lower reaches of the Klyazma and in the center of Vyaznikovsky District (a northeastern district in the oblast), have highly mineralized water and are associated with underground watercourses. The largest and deepest of them is Lake Kshchara. In the districts of Alexandrov and Yuryev-Polsky glacial lakes are small in size.

The main masses of wetlands in the region (total area of 37.4 thousand hectares) occur in Meshchera and Balakhna (in the northeast of the oblast) lowlands.

History
The territory of modern Vladimir Oblast has been populated since ancient times. The oldest known traces of human settlement date to the Upper Paleolithic. A settlement of Homo Sapiens dating back to between 32,050 BC and 28,550 BC was discovered in the area of Sungir, located around 200km east of Moscow.

The region of Vladimir were inhabited by different people like Slavs, Tatars, Finno-Ugrics and Balts. The East Slavic tribe of the Buzhans originated in the Vladimir region. Archaeological excavations of Volga Finn settlements document also the Finno-Ugric roots of this land. Merya, Muromian, and Meshchera are inhabited territory of the region during this period.

Since the 10th century AD, Slavic colonization of the area began in Murom and Suzdal. The current territory of Vladimir Oblast became was part of Kievan Rus. After the breakdown of the authority of Kievan Rus, the region became part of the Rostov-Suzdal principality in the 11th century and then the Vladimir-Suzdal principality in the 12th century. The Vladimir region rapidly developed in the mid-12th century during the rule of Yuri Dolgorukiy and Andrey Bogolyubsky. New townships arose—Yuriev-Polsky, Yaropolch-Zalessky, Gorokhovets, Starodub-on-the-Klyazma, Mstislavl—along with princely residences in Kideksha and Bogolyubovo.

The Vladimir Highway, a pre-modern civilian road that has been in use since atleast the 14th century, traverses the region, bringing people between Moscow and Nizhny Novgorod.

Most, if not all, of modern Vladimir, during the Soviet period, seems to have been part of Ivanovo Oblast until it became a separate Federal Subject in 1944.

Politics

During the Soviet period, the high authority in the oblast was shared between three persons: The first secretary of the Vladimir CPSU Committee (who in reality had the greatest authority), the chairman of the oblast Soviet (legislative power), and the Chairman of the oblast Executive Committee (executive power). Since 1991, CPSU lost all the power, and the head of the Oblast administration, and eventually the governor was appointed/elected alongside elected regional parliament.

The Charter of Vladimir Oblast is the fundamental law of the region. The Legislative Assembly of Vladimir Oblast is the province's standing legislative (representative) body. The Legislative Assembly exercises its authority by passing laws, resolutions, and other legal acts and by supervising the implementation and observance of the laws and other legal acts passed by it. The highest executive body is the Oblast Government, which includes territorial executive bodies such as district administrations, committees, and commissions that facilitate development and run the day to day matters of the province. The Oblast administration supports the activities of the Governor who is the highest official and acts as guarantor of the observance of the oblast Charter in accordance with the Constitution of Russia.

Administrative divisions

Economy and transportation
The largest companies in the region include the local branches of Mondelez International (revenues of $ million in 2017) and Ferrero SpA ($ million), Treyd Servis (baby food manufacturer, $ million), Starodvorskiye Kolbasy (sausage producer, $ million).

The Gusevskoye peat narrow gauge railway for hauling peat operates in the Gus-Khrustalny District.

Demographics
Population:  1,443,693 (2010 Census); 

Births (2012): 16 445 (11.5 per 1000)
Deaths (2012): 23 733 (16.6 per 1000) 
Total fertility rate:
2009 - 1.46 | 2010 - 1.46 | 2011 - 1.50 | 2012 - 1.62 | 2013 - 1.59 | 2014 - 1.64 | 2015 - 1.73 | 2016 - 1.72(e)

Ethnic composition (2010):
Russians: 95.6%
Ukrainians: 0.9%
Tatars: 0.5%
Armenians: 0.5%
Belarusians: 0.3%
Others: 2.2%
95,410 people were registered from administrative databases, and did not declare an ethnicity. It is estimated that the proportion of ethnicities in this group is the same as that of the declared group.

Settlements

Religion

According to a 2012 survey 42.3% of the population of Vladimir Oblast adheres to the Russian Orthodox Church, 5.1% are unaffiliated Christians, 1.2% are Eastern Orthodox Christian believers who don't belong to the church or belong to other (non-Russian) Eastern Orthodox churches, and 0.5% of the population are adherents of the Slavic native faith (Rodnovery). In addition, 32% of the population declares to be "spiritual but not religious", 13.9% is atheist, and 4.8% follows other religions or did not give an answer to the question.

Notable people
Edward Shatov (born 1973), Russian Catholic priest, director of Center for Family of Roman Catholic Archdiocese of Mother of God at Moscow

References

Notes

Sources

External links 

 

 
States and territories established in 1944
Oblasts of Russia